Philippe Arthuys (22 November 1928 – 6 January 2010) was a French composer and film director. He worked on over 20 films between 1959 and 1997. His 1965 film The Glass Cage was entered into the 4th Moscow International Film Festival.

Selected filmography
 The Glass Cage (1965)

References

External links

1928 births
2010 deaths
French composers
French male composers
Film directors from Paris
20th-century French musicians
20th-century French male musicians